USS Beaufort (PCS-1387) – initially known as USS PCS-1387 -- was a PCS-1376-class submarine chaser acquired by the U.S. Navy during World War II. Although constructed and designed as an anti-submarine patrol ship, she was used throughout the war, and afterwards, as a training ship for sonar operators.

Built at Whitestone, New York
The fourth ship to be so named by the Navy, Beaufort (PCS-1387) was laid down on 22 May 1943, at Whitestone, New York; launched on 10 October 1944, as simply PCS-1387; sponsored by Miss Barbara C. Dietz; and commissioned at the New York Navy Yard on 27 November 1944.

World War II service
After fitting out, the subchaser embarked upon her shakedown cruise on 15 December. She conducted that training out of Key West, Florida, between 22 December 1944 and 2 January 1945.

On the latter day, PCS-1387 began duty with the Fleet Sonar School, Key West, Florida, as a training platform for new sonarmen. She also doubled as harbor guard ship at Key West. Such training duties continued past the end of the war, through the late 1940s, and into the 1950s.

The 1950s, however, brought an increase in the extent of her zone of operations for, after that time, she ranged the Atlantic Ocean coast as far north as Narragansett Bay and south into the Caribbean. On 15 February 1956, she was named Beaufort. Just over a month later on 26 March, Beaufort was decommissioned at St. Petersburg, Florida.

Continued duty as a training ship
Her usefulness to the Navy, however, did not end there. She was retained in service for another 11 years under the Commandant, 6th Naval District, as a training ship for naval reservists.

Designated as a target ship
On 15 July 1967, her name was struck from the Navy List, and she was turned over to the Naval Weapons Laboratory, Dahlgren, Virginia, for use as a target. Apparently, she was not totally destroyed because she was sold in July 1972 to Mr. David Hahn of British Honduras.

References
 
 NavSource Online: Patrol Craft Sweeper - Photo Archive - Beaufort (PCS 1387) - ex-PCS-1387

 

PCS-1376-class minesweepers
Ships built in Queens, New York
1944 ships
World War II patrol vessels of the United States
World War II minesweepers of the United States
Training ships of the United States Navy